Sarah Thyre (born July 9, 1968) is an American actress and screenwriter. She played the role of Coach Cherri Wolf on the television show Strangers with Candy.

Early life
Thyre is the second of five children in a Roman Catholic family. She was raised in Kansas City and Louisiana. After her parents' divorce, she and her four siblings lived with their mother and struggled with poverty. Thyre earned a Bachelor of Arts degree in journalism from Montclair State University.

Personal life
Thyre wrote a memoir about her childhood entitled Dark at the Roots published by Counterpoint. Thyre married comedian and television sidekick Andy Richter in 1994. The couple had two children before divorcing in 2019.

Filmography

Film

Television

References

External links
 
 
 Interview on The Sound of Young America podcast

1968 births
Living people
Actresses from Louisiana
American television actresses
American women comedians
Place of birth missing (living people)
20th-century American actresses
21st-century American actresses
20th-century American comedians
21st-century American comedians